Holders of the office of Lord Chamberlain of Scotland are known from about 1124.
It was ranked by King Malcolm as the third great Officer of State, called Camerarius Domini Regis, and had a salary of £200 per annum allotted to him. He anciently collected the revenues of the Crown, at least before Scotland had a Treasurer, of which office there is no vestige until the restoration of King James I when he disbursed the money necessary for the maintenance of the King's Household.

The Great Chamberlain had jurisdiction for judging of all crimes committed within burgh, and of the crime of forestalling; and was in effect Justice-General over the burghs, and held Chamberlain-ayrs every year for that purpose; the form whereof is set down in Iter Camerarii, the Chamberlain-ayr. He was a supreme judge and his Decrees could not be questioned by any inferior judicatory. His sentences were to be put into execution by the baillies of burghs. He also settled the prices of provisions within burghs, and the fees of the workmen in the Mint.

The Chamberlain lost his financial functions after 1425 to the Treasurer. The position was vacant from 1558 to 1565 and again from 1569. It was occupied in 1580 for the cousin of James I, Esmé Stewart, 1st Duke of Lennox, whose appearance as a Great Officer of State in 1581 is attributable to his personal standing with the king rather than his office.  But following the Raid of Ruthven, 24 August 1582, the Great Chamberlain lost his supervision of the royal burghs.

Thereafter the office was held by successive Dukes of Lennox (heritably from 1603) until resigned to the Crown ad perpetuam remanentiam by the Duke of Richmond and Lennox in 1703, since which time no Great Chamberlain has been appointed.  In 1711 a form of the office was revived in a Commission of Chamberlainry and Trade, which lapsed on the death of Queen Anne.

Lord Chamberlains
David I of Scotland
 Edmund, witnessed a charter granting Annandale to Robert de Brus in 1124.
 1130-1153: Herbert
Malcolm IV of Scotland
 1153-1160: Herbert
 1160-1165: Nicolaus, later Lord Chancellor
William the Lion
 1165-1189: Walter de Berkeley of Redcastle
 1205-14: Philip de Valognes
Alexander II of Scotland
 1214-19: William de Valognes
 Hugo de Giffard, Lord of Yester and Morham
 John de Melville
 1216: Henry de Balliol (d. 1246)
 1228: David de Bernham (later Bishop of St Andrews)
 1231-41: Sir John de Maccuswel (or Maxwell)
Alexander III of Scotland
 c.1250/1: Sir Robert de Meyners
 1252-1255: William, Earl of Mar
 1255-1257: David de Lindsay of Barnweill and Byres
 1257-60: Aylmer de Maxwell lord of Caerlaverock, Sheriff of Dumfries, son of Sir John Maxwell.
 1260: William, Earl of Mar, again
 1267: Sir Reginald Cheyne
 1269: Sir Thomas Randolph, father of Thomas Randolph, 1st Earl of Moray,
 1278: John de Lindsay
Guardians of the Kingdom of Scotland (First Interregnum)(1286-1292)
 1287-1292: Alexander de Baliol
John Balliol
 1292-1296: Alexander de Baliol
Guardians of the Kingdom of Scotland (Second Interregnum) (1296-1306)
1297-1307: John Sandale
Robert the Bruce
 1307: Eustace de Cotesbache
 1319: William de Lindsay
 1325: Alexander Fraser of Touchfraser and Cowie (who married Mary, the King's sister)
David II of Scotland
 1329: John Baptista
 1327-1329: Robert de Peebles
 1329-1333: Reginald de Mure
 1333: Sir Robert Lauder of Quarrelwood and The Bass (d. 1337) (also Justiciar of Scotia)
 1334: William Bullock, under Edward Balliol
 1334-1340: Reginald de Mure
 1341-1342: William Bullock, again
 1343-1346: John de Roxburgh
 c.1350-1357: Sir Robert de Erskine
 1357-1358: Thomas Stewart, 2nd Earl of Angus
 1358-1359: Thomas, Earl of Mar
 1359-1363: Walter Fleming of Biggar
 c1363-1364:  Sir Robert de Erskine, again
 1364-1371: Walter of Biggar, again
Robert II of Scotland
 1371-1376: Walter of Biggar, again
 1376: Michael de Monymusk, Bishop of Dunkeld
 1377-1382: Sir John Lyon
 1382: Robert Stewart, Earl of Fife
Robert III of Scotland
James I of Scotland
 1424-1448: Sir John Forrester of Corstorphine, Knt.
James II of Scotland
 1448-1450: James Livingston, 1st Lord Livingston
 1450-1454: James Crichton, 2nd Lord Crichton and Earl of Moray
 1454-1467: James Livingston, 1st Lord Livingston
James III of Scotland
 1467: Robert Boyd, 1st Lord Boyd
 1477: James Stewart, 1st Earl of Buchan
 1483: David Lindsay, 5th Earl of Crawford
James IV of Scotland
 1488: Alexander Home, 2nd Lord Home
 1509: Alexander Home, 3rd Lord Home
James V of Scotland
 1516: Malcolm Fleming, 3rd Lord Fleming (d. 1547 at Battle of Pinkie)
Mary, Queen of Scots
 1547: James Fleming, 4th Lord Fleming (d. 1558)
James VI of Scotland
 1565: John Fleming, 5th Lord Fleming (d. 1572)
 1581: Esmé Stewart, 1st Duke of Lennox
 1594: Ludovick (or Louis) Stewart, Duke of Lennox (made heritable Chamberlains).

References

 The Staggering State of the Scots' Statesmen, by Sir John Scot of Scotstarvet, Director of Chancery, Edinburgh, 1754, pps: 137-8. 
 The Exchequer Rolls of Scotland, edited by George Burnett, Lord Lyon King of Arms, vol.II, 1359–1379, Edinburgh, 1878, in the appendix to the Preface is a list of Chamberlains of Scotland to 1406 only. See also p.cxxiii. 
 A History of the House of Douglas, by James Balfour Paul Vol II p. 3, London 1902.

Members of the Privy Council of Scotland
Lists of office-holders in Scotland
Positions within the British Royal Household
Political office-holders in Scotland